Bonito (Beautiful) (population 38,117) is a city in northeastern Brazil, in the State of Pernambuco. It lies in the mesoregion of Agreste of Pernambuco.Has 399.5 sq/km of total area.

Geography
 State - Pernambuco
 Region - Agreste of Pernambuco
 Boundaries - Camocim de São Félix, Sairé and Barra de Guabiraba (N); Palmares and Catende(S), Cortês and Joaquim Nabuco (E); São Joaquim do Monte and Belém de Maria (W).
 Area - 399.5 km2
 Elevation - 443 m
 Hydrography - Sirinhaém and Una rivers
 Vegetation - Subcaducifolia Forest
 Climate - Hot and Humid
 Annual average temperature - 21 c
 Main road -  BR 232 and PE 103
 Distance to Recife - 128 km

Economy

Principal economic activity for Bonito is the agricultural sector. Sugar cane, cattle, tuber production, poultry and fruit. tourism is an emerging field due to the many natural waterfalls accessible by a newly asphalted highway.

Bonito is experiencing a real estate boom driving up the prices of building lots and rental units, proposed improvements to the main route into the city will further drive development.

Economic Indicators

Economy by Sector
2006

Health Indicators

References

External links 
 Travel Package to Bonito - Pernambuco

Municipalities in Pernambuco